This list of closed stadiums by capacity shows demolished, unused, or otherwise closed sports stadiums ordered by their capacity, that is the maximum number of spectators that the stadium could accommodate seated. Stadiums that had a capacity of 5,000 or greater are included.

Most of the largest past stadiums were used for Association football or American football. However, some high capacity venues were used for baseball, cricket, Gaelic games, rugby union, rugby league, Australian rules football and Canadian football. Many stadiums had a running track around the perimeter of the pitch allowing them to be used for athletics.

List

Ancient past stadiums

See also 
List of stadiums
List of stadiums by capacity
List of indoor arenas
List of African stadiums by capacity
List of Asian stadiums by capacity
List of European stadiums by capacity
List of North American stadiums by capacity
List of Oceanian stadiums by capacity
List of South American stadiums by capacity
List of association football stadiums by capacity
List of association football stadiums by country
List of American football stadiums by capacity
List of rugby union stadiums by capacity
List of Gaelic Athletic Association stadiums
List of tennis stadiums by capacity
List of attendance figures at domestic professional sports leagues
List of sporting venues with a highest attendance of 100,000 or more
List of covered stadiums by capacity
List of future stadiums

References 

Lists of stadiums
Lists of sports venues with capacity